Ultra Violet & Black Scorpion is an American superhero coming-of-age action-comedy television series developed by Leo Chu and Eric S. Garcia and created by Dan Hernandez and Benji Samit that aired on Disney Channel from June 3 to November 11, 2022. The series stars Scarlett Estevez, J.R. Villarreal, Marianna Burelli, Juan Alfonso, Brandon Rossel, Zelia Ankrum, and Bryan Blanco.

Plot 
The series centers on 13-year-old Violet Rodriguez who is constantly overshadowed by her brother Santiago Rodriguez. One day, she is chosen by a magical Luchador mask to be its wearer. When she puts it on, Violet becomes a superhero that possesses super-speed. In need of a collaboration, she trails the Luchador superhero Black Scorpion and discovers that he is Violet's uncle Cruz. With both of them knowing each other's secrets, Cruz agrees to train Violet and have her follow in his footsteps.

Cast

Main 
 Scarlett Estevez as Violet Rodriguez / Ultra Violet, a 13-year-old girl who gets chosen by a magical Luchador mask that transforms her into a superhero with super-speed
 J.R. Villarreal as Cruz De la Vega / Black Scorpion, Violet's maternal uncle and superhero mentor who owns a wrestling gym and fights crime in secret where he possesses super-strength and the ability to teleport through shadows
 Marianna Burelli as Nina Rodriguez, Violet's mother and Cruz's sister who is the principal of Dolores Huerta Middle School
 Juan Alfonso as Juan Carlos Rodriguez, Violet's father who is a big lucha libre fan
 Brandon Rossel as Santiago "Tiago" Rodriguez, Violet's over-achieving elder brother
 Zelia Ankrum as Maya Miller-Martinez, Violet's best friend and confidante to whom Violet tells about the mask and secret identity
 Bryan Blanco as Luis León, an antisocial hall monitor at Dolores Huerta Middle School and a gossip blogger who wants to unmask Ultra Violet

Recurring 
 Lorena Jorge as Catalina Rivera, a school counselor at Dolores Huerta Middle School and Cruz's love interest who is secretly the matter-phasing masked antihero known as Cascada

Episodes

Production 
On January 21, 2020, Disney Channel gave Ultra Violet & Blue Demon a cast-contingent pilot order. Dan Hernandez and Benji Samit serve as executive producers. Blue Demon Jr. was also set to be an executive producer. Dan Hernandez and Benji Samit serve as writers. On March 11, 2020, it was announced that Juan Alfonso joined the series. Also set to star in the series are Marianna Burelli, Brandon Rossel, Zelia Ankrum, and Bryan Blanco. The first episode was set to be directed by Alejandro Damiani. On August 2, 2021, it was announced that J.R. Villareal had joined the series, now titled Ultra Violet & Black Scorpion. Eric Garcia and Leo Chu serve as showrunners and additional executive producers. Blue Demon Jr. no longer has any involvement with the series. The series is filmed using single-camera. On April 28, 2022, it was announced that the series would premiere on June 3, 2022. The first ten episodes were released on Disney+ on June 8, 2022. The series was filmed in New Orleans. On November 18, 2022, it was reported that the series was canceled after one season.

Ratings 
 
}}

Notes

References

External links 
 
 

2020s American children's comedy television series
2020s American superhero comedy television series
2022 American television series debuts
2022 American television series endings
Disney Channel original programming
English-language television shows